John Perkins may refer to:
John Perkins (Australian politician) (1878–1954), Australian politician
John Perkins (author) (born 1945), American author of Confessions of an Economic Hit Man
John Perkins (rugby union) (born 1954), Wales international rugby union player
John Perkins Jr. (1819–1885), American politician, son of John Perkins Sr.
John Perkins Sr. (1781–1866), American judge and planter
John Perkins (physician) (1698–1781), American physician and essayist
John M. Perkins (born 1930), American civil rights activist, American Christian minister, author
Johnny Perkins (1953–2007), American football receiver with the New York Giants
John Perkins (Royal Navy officer) (fl. 1775–1812), Captain, Napoleonic War
John Alanson Perkins (1914–1982), American academic administrator and government official
John Frederick Perkins (1910–1983), English entomologist
John Perkins (academic) (born 1950), British academic, engineering scientist and government adviser
John Astin Perkins (1907–1999), interior designer and architect
John Perkins (cricketer) (1837–1901), English cricketer

See also
Jack Perkins (disambiguation)
John (given name)
John Bryan Ward-Perkins (1912–1981), British Classical architectural historian
John Perkins Cushing (1787–1862), American sea merchant, opium smuggler, and philanthropist
Professor John Perkins' Review of Engineering Skills
Perkins (disambiguation)